The Villa St. Rose is a former Catholic convent and girls' school located in north Portland, Oregon. It is listed on the National Register of Historic Places.

History
The Villa St. Rose was established in 1902 by the Congregation of Our Lady of Charity of the Good Shepherd, founded by sister Rose Virginia Pelletier, a native of France. Pelletier received her holy habit and was officiated as Sister Mary of St. Euphasia in 1815 at the Convent of Refuge in Angers, France.

The Villa served as a boarding school for troubled adolescent girls, and in its early years had a peak of 200 students. By 1972, the Villa continued to serve in this manner, housing and rehabilitating girls from ages 12 to 21.

As of 2017, the Villa has been converted into Rosemont Court, which contains housing for 100 low-income elders and 18 families.

See also 
 National Register of Historic Places listings in North Portland, Oregon

References

Sources

External links

 entry

1902 establishments in Oregon
Colonial Revival architecture in Oregon
Georgian architecture in Oregon
National Register of Historic Places in Portland, Oregon
Houses on the National Register of Historic Places in Oregon
Joseph Jacobberger buildings
North Portland, Oregon
Piedmont, Portland, Oregon
Portland Historic Landmarks